The Saudi Arabian records in swimming are the fastest ever performances of swimmers from Saudi Arabia, which are recognised and ratified by the Saudi Arabian Swimming Federation (SASF).

All records were set in finals unless noted otherwise.

Long Course (50 m)

Men

Women

Short Course (25 m)

Men

Women

References

External links
 SASF web site

Saudi Arabia
Records
Swimming
Swimming